Moustapha Kouyaté (born 3 March 1994) is a Guinean footballer who plays as a forward for Hafia FC and the Guinea national team.

Career
Kouyaté began his career in his native Guinea, before stints abroad in Morocco, Gabon, Oman. He transferred to the Congolese club Mazembe in October 2020. On  august 19 he signed at Raja Casablanca

International career
Kouyaté made his debut with the Guinea national team in a 1–0 2021 Africa Cup of Nations qualification win over Mali on 24 March 2021.

References

External links
 
 
 
 

1994 births
Living people
People from Nzérékoré
Guinean footballers
Guinea international footballers
Association football forwards
TP Mazembe players
Fath Union Sport players
Guinée Championnat National players
Gabon Championnat National D1 players
Linafoot players
Guinean expatriate footballers
Guinean expatriates in Morocco
Guinean expatriates in Gabon
Guinean expatriates in Oman
Guinean expatriates in the Democratic Republic of the Congo
Expatriate footballers in Morocco
Expatriate footballers in Gabon
Expatriate footballers in Oman
Expatriate footballers in the Democratic Republic of the Congo